The Triumph Motor Company was a British car and motor manufacturing company in the 19th and 20th centuries. The marque had its origins in 1885 when Siegfried Bettmann of Nuremberg formed S. Bettmann & Co. and started importing bicycles from Europe and selling them under his own trade name in London. The trade name became "Triumph" the following year, and in 1887 Bettmann was joined by a partner, Moritz Schulte, also from Germany. In 1889, the businessmen started producing their own bicycles in Coventry, England.

Triumph manufactured its first car in 1923. The company was acquired by Leyland Motors in 1960, ultimately becoming part of the giant conglomerate British Leyland (BL) in 1968, where the Triumph brand was absorbed into BL's Specialist Division alongside former Leyland stablemates Rover and Jaguar.  Triumph-badged vehicles were produced by BL until 1984 when the Triumph marque was retired, where it remained dormant under the auspices of BL's successor company Rover Group.  The rights to the Triumph marque are currently owned by BMW, who purchased the Rover Group in 1994.

Triumph Cycle Company 
The company was renamed the Triumph Cycle Co. Ltd. in 1897. In 1902 they began producing Triumph motorcycles at their works in Coventry on Much Park Street. At first, they used engines purchased from another company, but the business prospered and they soon started making their own engines. In 1907 they purchased the premises of a spinning mill on Priory Street to develop a new factory. Major orders for the 550 cc Model H were placed by the British Army during the First World War; by 1918 Triumph had become Britain's largest manufacturer of motorcycles.

In 1921 Bettmann was persuaded by his general manager Claude Holbrook (1886–1979), who had joined the company in 1919, to acquire the assets and Clay Lane premises of the Dawson Car Company and start producing a car and 1.4-litre engine type named the Triumph 10/20 designed for them by Lea-Francis, to whom they paid a royalty for every car sold. Production of this car and its immediate successors was moderate, but this changed with the introduction in 1927 of the Triumph Super 7, which sold in large numbers until 1934.

Triumph Motor Company 

In 1930 the company's name was changed to Triumph Motor Company. Holbrook realised he could not compete with the larger car companies for the mass market, so he decided to produce expensive cars, and introduced the models  Southern Cross and Gloria.  At first they used engines made by Triumph but designed by Coventry Climax, but in 1937 Triumph started to produce engines to their own designs by Donald Healey, who had become the company's experimental manager in 1934.

The company encountered financial problems however, and in 1936 the Triumph bicycle and motorcycle businesses were sold, the latter to Jack Sangster of Ariel to become Triumph Engineering Co Ltd. Healey purchased an Alfa Romeo 8C 2300 and developed a new car model with an Alfa inspired straight-8 engine type named the Triumph Dolomite. Three of these cars were made in 1934, one of which was used in competition and destroyed in an accident. The Dolomites manufactured from 1937 to 1940 were unrelated to these prototypes.

In July 1939 the Triumph Motor Company went into receivership and the factory, equipment and goodwill were offered for sale. The Thos. W. Ward scrapping company purchased Triumph, and placed Healey in charge as general manager, but the effects of the Second World War again stopped the production of cars; the Holbrook Lane works were completely destroyed by bombing in 1940.

Standard Triumph 

In November 1944 what was left of the Triumph Motor Company and the Triumph trade name were bought by the Standard Motor Company and a subsidiary "Triumph Motor Company (1945) Limited" was formed with production transferred to Standard's factory at Canley, on the outskirts of Coventry. Triumph's new owners had been supplying engines to Jaguar and its predecessor company since 1938. After an argument between Standard-Triumph managing director, Sir John Black, and William Lyons, the creator and owner of Jaguar, Black's objective in acquiring the rights to the name and the remnants of the bankrupt Triumph business was to build a car to compete with the soon to be launched post-war Jaguars.

The pre-war Triumph models were not revived and in 1946 a new range of Triumphs was announced, starting with the Triumph Roadster.  The Roadster had an aluminium body because steel was in short supply and surplus aluminium from aircraft production was plentiful. The same engine was used for the 1800 Town and Country saloon, later named the Triumph Renown, which was notable for the styling chosen by Standard-Triumph's managing director Sir John Black. A similar style was also used for the subsequent Triumph Mayflower light saloon. All three of these models prominently sported the "globe" badge that had been used on pre-war models. When Sir John was forced to retire from the company this range of cars was discontinued without being replaced directly, sheet aluminium having by now become a prohibitively expensive alternative to sheet steel for most auto-industry purposes.

In the early 1950s it was decided to use the Triumph name for sporting cars and the Standard name for saloons and in 1953 the Triumph TR2 was initiated, the first of the TR series of sports cars that were produced until 1981. Curiously, the TR2 had a Standard badge on its front and the Triumph globe on its hubcaps.

Standard had been making a range of small saloons named the Standard Eight and Ten, and had been working on their replacements. The success of the TR range meant that Triumph was considered a more marketable name than Standard, and the new car was introduced in 1959 as the Triumph Herald. The last Standard car to be made in the UK was replaced in 1963 by the Triumph 2000.

Leyland and beyond 

Standard-Triumph was bought by Leyland Motors Ltd. in December 1960; Donald Stokes became chairman of the Standard-Triumph division in 1963. In 1967 Leyland Motor Corporation bought the Rover company and in 1968 Leyland Motor Corporation merged with British Motor Holdings (created out of the merger of the British Motor Corporation and Jaguar two years earlier) which resulted in the formation of British Leyland Motor Corporation.

Triumph set up an assembly facility in Speke, Liverpool in 1960, gradually increasing the size of the company's most modern factory to the point that it could produce 100,000 cars per year. However, only a maximum of 30,000 cars was ever produced as the plant was never put into full production use, being used largely as an assembly plant. During the 1960s and '70s Triumph sold a succession of Michelotti-styled saloons and sports cars, including the advanced Dolomite Sprint, which, in 1973, already had a 16-valve four-cylinder engine. It is alleged that many Triumphs of this era were unreliable, especially the 2.5 PI (petrol injection) with its fuel injection problems. In Australia, the summer heat caused petrol in the electric fuel pump to vapourise, resulting in frequent malfunctions. The Lucas system proved unpopular: Lucas did not want to develop it further, and Standard-Triumph dealers were reluctant to attend the associated factory and field-based training courses.

For most of its time under Leyland or BL ownership the Triumph marque belonged in the Specialist Division of the company, which went by the names of Rover Triumph and later Jaguar Rover Triumph, except for a brief period during the mid-1970s when all BL's car marques or brands were grouped together under the name of Leyland Cars.

The only all-new Triumph model initiated as Rover Triumph was the TR7, which was in production successively at three factories that were closed: Speke, the poorly run Leyland-era Standard-Triumph works in Liverpool, the original Standard works at Canley, Coventry and finally the Rover works in Solihull. Plans for an extended range based on the TR7, including a fastback variant codenamed "Lynx", were ended when the Speke factory closed. The four-cylinder TR7 and its short-lived eight-cylindered derivative the TR8 were terminated when the road car section of the Solihull plant was closed (the plant continued to build Land Rovers.)

Demise of Triumph cars 
The last Triumph model was the Acclaim, introduced in 1981 and essentially a rebadged Honda Ballade built under licence from the Japanese carmaker Honda, at the former Morris Motors works in Cowley, Oxford. The Triumph name disappeared over the summer of 1984, when the Acclaim was replaced by the Rover 200, a rebadged version of Honda's next generation Civic/Ballade model. This was the first phase of a rebranding of the Rover Group which would also see the Austin and Morris brands disappear by the end of the 1980s and the Rover brand dominate most of the company's products.

The BL car division had by then been named the Austin Rover Group, which also retired the Morris marque in 1984 as well as the Triumph brand.

Personalities 
 Johnny Hallyday owned a Triumph TR3
 Philippe Monnet used to own a 1961 Triumph Herald 1200 that he sold in 2015 in Nice to Machoir
 Henri Pescarolo owned a Triumph TR3
 Jacques Laffite owned a Triumph TR3
 John Lennon owned a Triumph Herald (convertible)

Films and TV series featuring Triumphs 
 In Alfred Hitchcock Presents, TV Series, 1955–1962 (Triumph TR3A)
 In Dr No, 1962 James Bond film with Sean Connery (Triumph Herald)
 In My Favorite Martian TV Series 1963- (Later 2 different cars) with Bill Bixby and Ray Walston (Triumph TR4)
 In Le Gendarme de Saint-Tropez, in 1964 with Louis de Funès and Michel Galabru (Triumph TR3A)
 In 1962, Go French ! Triumph Herald 12/50, Triumph Herald 1200, with Jean Lefebvre or Jean Carmet
 In Thunderball (1965) is the fourth spy film in the James Bond series starring Sean Connery (Triumph Herald)
 In Les Aventures de Michel Vaillant, TV series, in 1967 (Triumph TR3A) – (Triumph TR4)
 In The Great Holidays (movie), 1967 (Triumph TR4A – Triumph Herald Saloon) with Louis de Funès
 In Fantômas contre Scotland Yard, Film, 1967 with Jean Marais or Louis de Funès (Triumph Herald 1200 Estate)
 In Les Globe-trotters, TV Series, 1966–1968 (Triumph TR3A)
 In The Brain (1969) with Jean-Paul Belmondo, Bourvil, David Niven or Eli Wallach (Triumph TR4)
 In Le clan des siciliens, Film, 1969 with Jean Gabin, Lino Ventura or Alain Delon (Triumph Herald 13/60)
 In Derrick, TV Series, 1974–1998 (Triumph TR4A) with Horst Tappert, Fritz Wepper
 In 1971 Diamonds are Forever, James Bond 007, played by Sean Connery, travels to Amsterdam in the Netherlands at the wheel of a Triumph Stag.
 In Straw Dogs – Triumph Stag
 In The Adventures of Rabbi Jacob (1973), (Triumph TR4) with Louis de Funès, Henri Guybet or Popeck
 In Starsky and Hutch, TV series, 1975–1979 (Triumph TR3A)
 In Scout toujours..., French comedy film by Gérard Jugnot released in 1985 (Triumph TR4)
 In Three Men and a Baby 1987, Tom Selleck drives a (Triumph TR6)
 In The Grimleys 1999–2001, PE teacher Douglas "Dynamo" Digby, drives a Triumph Spitfire
 In Top Gear, TV series, 2002–2015 (Triumph Herald 1200)
 In Final Destination 3 (2006), Triumph Spitfire
 In Legend, 2015 film featuring Tom Hardy (Triumph Spitfire)
 In Viva Las Vegas (1964) Ann-Margret drives a TR-3
 In Educating Rita, Michael Caine's character, Frank, drives a Triumph Herald
 In Fellini's film La Dolce Vita (1960) Marcello Mastroianni and Anita Ekberg drive a TR3A
 In tterfield 8, Elizabeth Taylor has a TR3A

 Current ownership 

The trademark is owned currently by BMW, which acquired Triumph when it bought the Rover Group in 1994. When it sold Rover, it kept the Triumph marque. The Phoenix Consortium, which bought Rover, tried to buy the Triumph brand, but BMW refused, saying that if Phoenix insisted, it would break the deal. The Standard marque was transferred to British Motor Heritage Limited. The Standard marque is still retained by British Motor Heritage, who also have the licence to use the Triumph marque in relation to the sale of spares and service of the existing 'park' of Triumph cars.

In late 2007, the magazine Auto Express, after continued rumours that Triumph might be revived with BMW ownership, featured a story showing an image of what a new version of the TR4 might look like. BMW did not comment officially on this.

Triumph car models

Pre-war

Post war

Prototypes
 Triumph TR7 Sprint
 Triumph Fury
 Triumph Lynx

Triumph-based models

BadgingGlobePre-war Triumphs carried a stylised Globe badge, usually on the radiator grille, and this was also used on the first three models produced under Standard's control.GriffinStandard had introduced a new badge in 1947 for their own models, first seen on the Vanguard, a highly stylised motif based on the wings of a Griffin. With the introduction of the TR2, a version of this badge appeared for the first time on the bonnet of a production Triumph, while the Globe continued to appear on the hubcaps. This same double-badging also appeared on the TR3 and TR4, the 2000 and the 1300.

However, the original Herald, Spitfire, Vitesse and GT6 models all carried only the Griffin badge on their bonnets/radiator grilles, with unadorned hubcaps.

The TR4A appeared with a Globe badge on the bonnet, apparently signifying a return to the original Triumph badging. This was short-lived, as a policy of Leylandisation mean that neither Globe nor Griffin appeared on subsequent models from the TR5 onwards, or on later versions of the Spitfire, GT6 and 2000.LeylandLeyland's corporate badge, a design based on the spokes of a wheel, appeared on the hubcaps of the 1500FWD, and next to the Triumph name on the metal identification labels fitted to the bootlids of various models. It was also used for the oil filler cap on the Dolomite Sprint engine. However it was never used as a bonnet badge, with models of that era such as the TR6 and the second generation 2000 carrying a badge simply stating the name "Triumph".StagThe Stag model carried a unique grille badge showing a highly stylised stag.Laurel wreath'

The last versions of the TR7 and Dolomite ranges received an all-new badge with the word Triumph surrounded by laurel wreaths, and this was also used for the Acclaim. It was carried on the bonnet and the steering wheel boss.

See also
 List of car manufacturers of the United Kingdom
 Triumph Motorcycles Ltd

References

Further reading

External links

 Coventry University—Triumph 1918 to 1939—interview with Sir Claude Holbrook transcript available
Standard Triumph Online Archive Standard Triumph Archive & Database
The Pre-1940 Triumph Owners Club For all pre-1940 cars
VINTAGE TRIUMPH REGISTER North American Triumph Club
Triumph paint codes and colour examples
International Triumph TR Registry free database with Commission numbers and photographs of TR2-TR6s

British Motor Heritage Ltd
Club Triumph - the original British Triumph club
Triumph Sports Car Club of South Africa – Cape Town branch – A South African club for Triumph owners & enthusiasts
Catalogue of the Standard-Triumph archives, held at the Modern Records Centre, University of Warwick
In-depth Triumph timeline chart 1959 to 1971

 
Car manufacturers of the United Kingdom
Defunct motor vehicle manufacturers of England
BMW
Coventry motor companies
1885 establishments in England
1984 disestablishments in England
Vehicle manufacturing companies established in 1885
Vehicle manufacturing companies disestablished in 1984
British brands
British Leyland
British companies disestablished in 1984
British companies established in 1885
Sports car manufacturers